DXDR (981 AM) RMN Dipolog is a radio station owned and operated by Radio Mindanao Network. Its studio and transmitter are located at RMN Broadcast Center, National Highway, Brgy. Turno, Dipolog. The station also airs a handful of programs from RMN Cebu.

History

In 1981, as part of its massive expansion program initiated in 1978, Radio Mindanao Network commenced its AM broadcasting operations in Dipolog under the call sign DXDR. This move was the second RMN AM station opened in Zamboanga Peninsula after DXRZ of Zamboanga City in 1961, and the second AM station to operate in the city after RPN DXKD Radyo Ronda. Its launching was done the same year as DXPR RMN Pagadian.

References

Radio Mindanao Network
Radio stations in Zamboanga del Norte
Radio stations established in 1981
News and talk radio stations in the Philippines